Rebekah Gardner (born July 9, 1990) is an American professional basketball player who plays for the Chicago Sky in the Women's National Basketball Association (WNBA). She played college basketball at UCLA.

College career
During her first three years at UCLA, Gardner was mainly a role player off the bench for the Bruins. Her freshman season Gardner scored a then career-high 13 points over USC. During her sophomore year, Gardner made 7 starts for the Bruins and then increased her career-high in points to 19 against Washington State. She also was named to the Pac-10 All-Academic Honorable Mention Team. During her senior season, Gardner started in all 30 games for UCLA and became a focal point to their offense. She increased her scoring to 15.9 points and gathered in 6.4 rebounds. This got her named to the All-Pac-12 Team.

College statistics

Professional career

Overseas
For the 2020–2021 season, Gardner had signed to play with Uni Girona Club de Basquet for the Liga Dia season. Fellow UCLA Bruin alums, Michaela Onyenwere and Kennedy Burke also signed to play with the club.

WNBA

Chicago Sky
Gardner signed a training camp contract with the Sky on March 22, 2017.

On February 10, 2022, Gardner signed a training camp contract with the Chicago Sky. The undrafted 31 yr old made the Sky's roster & has been a vital cog in the teams' 2nd best record in the league, as of 6-28-2022.

WNBA career statistics

Regular season

|-
| align="left" | 2022
| align="left" | Chicago
| 35 || 2 || 21.7 || .542 || .357 || .800 || 3.3 || 1.3 || 1.4 || 0.5 || 1.6 || 8.4
|-
| align="left" | Career
| align="left" | 1 year, 1 team
| 35 || 2 || 21.7 || .542 || .357 || .800 || 3.3 || 1.3 || 1.4 || 0.5 || 1.6 || 8.4

Playoffs

|-
| align="left" | 2022
| align="left" | Chicago
| 8 || 0 || 17.9 || .389 || .000 || .857 || 3.3 || 1.8 || 0.8 || 0.4 || 0.9 || 5.0
|-
| align="left" | Career
| align="left" | 1 year, 1 team
| 8 || 0 || 17.9 || .389 || .000 || .857 || 3.3 || 1.8 || 0.8 || 0.4 || 0.9 || 5.0

Personal life
Gardner is cousins with former NFL player Toussaint Tyler.

References

External links
WNBA bio
UCLA bio

1990 births
Living people
American women's basketball players
Basketball players from California
Guards (basketball)
Forwards (basketball)
UCLA Bruins women's basketball players
Chicago Sky players
People from Upland, California
Undrafted Women's National Basketball Association players